Quintin Barry's Top 20 Countdown (commonly abbreviated to QB20) is an internationally syndicated, independent radio program created by Quintin Barry and is distributed worldwide by QB Productions.

As its title implies, QB20 counts down the twenty most popular songs in the United States of America, from #20 to #1. The charts currently are based on data from Mediabase, and published in the Tuesday Edition of USA Today.

History
The QB20 debuted in June 2010 on internet radio station Star 107 The Hits Channel, its only affiliate station. As of August 2012 it currently airs on 12 affiliate stations.

Special Countdowns
Occasionally QB's Top 20 airs special countdowns in place of the regular QB's Top 20 countdown show.  These included:

The QB20 Christmas Special
QB20 All-Request Spring Break
QB20 All Request Summer Edition

Guest Hosts
Cam Black
Matt Provost
Brendon Geoffrion
Sean Beall
Brad B

References

External links
Official website

2010 radio programme debuts
American music radio programs
Music chart shows